Geeta Bali (born Harkirtan Kaur; 30 November 1930 ‒ 21 January 1965) was an Indian actress who appeared in Hindi language films. She was the wife of noted film actor Shammi Kapoor.

Early life
Geeta Bali was born as Harikirtan Kaur in Amritsar in the Punjab Province of British India in 1930. She had an elder sister Haridarshan Kaur, whose daughter is actress Yogeeta Bali.

Career

Geeta Baali started her film career as a child actress, at the age of 12, with the film The Cobbler. She made her debut as a heroine in Badnaami (1946).

Bali became a star in the 1950s. She had also worked earlier with her future brother-in-law Raj Kapoor in Bawre Nain (1950) and with her future father-in-law Prithviraj Kapoor in Anand Math. Unlike other actresses who gave up films after marrying into the Kapoor family, Bali kept acting until her death. Her last film was Jab Se Tumhe Dekha Hai in 1963. She did more than 70 films in a 10-year career.

Bali helped Surinder Kapoor become a producer.

Personal life
On 23 August 1955, Geeta married Shammi Kapoor, with whom she was working in the film Coffee House. They had two children, a son (Aditya Raj Kapoor) and a daughter (Kanchan).

She died on 21 January 1965, at the age of 35, due to smallpox.

Filmography

References

External links
 
 I am Shamsherraj Kapoor - The Kapoor Family Website by Shammi Kapoor
 rediff.com, Movies: Geeta Bali

1930 births
1965 deaths
Indian film actresses
Actresses in Hindi cinema
Deaths from smallpox
Punjabi people
Indian Sikhs
Punjabi women
Infectious disease deaths in India
20th-century Indian actresses
Actresses from Amritsar